Alessandro Cordaro (born 2 May 1986) is a Belgian winger, who currently plays for Swift Hesperange in the Luxembourg Division of Honour.

Career
Cordaro began his career 1992 with R.A.A. Louviéroise and joined than in 2002 to Mons, here climbed 2006 with the team in the Jupiler League.

On 1 April 2009 R. Charleroi S.C. engaged the midfielder, who arrives from Mons and signed a three-year contract between 30 June 2012.

On 16 May 2011 he signed a 3-year contract with K.V. Mechelen

Statistics

International
Cordaro is of Italian descent. He has also played for Belgium U21 and holds nine games.

Honours
Zulte Waregem
 Belgian Cup: 2017

References

External links
 

1986 births
Living people
Belgian footballers
Belgium youth international footballers
Belgian people of Italian descent
R.A.A. Louviéroise players
R.A.E.C. Mons players
R. Charleroi S.C. players
K.V. Mechelen players
S.V. Zulte Waregem players
R.E. Virton players
Belgian Pro League players
Challenger Pro League players
People from La Louvière
Association football midfielders
Footballers from Hainaut (province)